Giselda is a given name. Notable people with the name include:

Giselda Leirner (born 1928), Brazilian writer, illustrator, and artist
Giselda Volodi (born 1959), Italian actress
Giselda Zani (1909–1975), Uruguayan poet, short story writer, and art critic

See also
Griselda